VIFF Vienna Independent Film Festival is an international film festival held annually in July in Vienna, capital of Austria. The festival focuses on independent cinema.

History 

The Vienna Independent Film Festival was held for the first time on 4–7 July 2016 in the cinemas UCI Kinowelt Millenium City and CineCenter. The festival program consisted of 38 films from 14 countries in international competition.
Opening film of the festival was God of Happiness by Dito Tsintsadze who won the Best Director award.
Grand Prix of the festival – The Golden Sphinx – was awarded to the Konkani film Let's dance to the rhythm directed by Bardroy Barretto.
Graham Streeter received the Best Feature Film award for his film Imperfect Sky.
The award for Best Documentary Film was awarded to Violins of Hope: Strings of the Holocaust narrated by Adrien Brody and directed by Lance Shultz.

Winners

2022

Grand Prix
Playing Through – directed by Balbinka Korzeniowska
Best Feature Film
Playing Through – directed by Balbinka Korzeniowska
Best Director
Balbinka Korzeniowska – Playing Through
Best Short Film
Živa (The Death of the Goddess Živa) – directed by Nataša Stearns
Best Music video
Frozen Heart – directed by Nina Guseva
Best Documentary Film
Ballymanus – directed by Patrick Sharkey, Séan Doupe
Best Experimental Film
Blue Delusion – directed by Guan Fang
Best Musical Film
Big Boss – directed by Keke Palmer
Best Comedy Film
Hot Mess by Evelyne Tollman
Best Animated Film
Me and My Winter Games-Perfect Holiday – directed by Haoling Lee, Ming Zhong, Zhe Zhang, Liwen Wang
Best Actress
Julia Rae – Playing Through
Best Actor
Brandon Sklenar – Futra Days
Best Supporting Actress
Rosanna Arquette – Futra Days
Best Film Score
Long Flat Balls “Broken Promises” – music by Zach Robinson
Best Song
Molly’s Rainbow – by Katie Hardyman
Best Cinematography
Other Side of the Mountain – directed by Markus Otz
Best Screenplay
JIZO-Evangelist – written and directed by Tokoroten Nakamura
Best Art Direction
The Violin and its Shadow – directed by Greg Babalas
Best Unproduced Script
The Faerie Rings – written by Zina Brown
Honorary Mention for Social Impact
Change of Course – directed by Andreas Ortner

2020 
Grand Prix
Grand Cancan — Directed by Mikhail Kosyrev-Nesterov

Best Feature Film
 — Directed by Toma Enache

Best Director
Great Poetry (Aleksandr Lungin)

Best Original Screenplay
Laugh or Die — Original Screenplay by Heikki Kujanpää

Best Short Film
To Her — Directed by Jacopo Ardolino

Best Documentary Film
Armenia(s), Time for Artists — Directed by Anahit Dasseux Ter Mesropian and David Vital-Durand

Best Experimental Film
Our Turn — Directed by Martiros Vartanov

Best Music Video
Champagne Drag Queen — Directed by Anna Haslehner

Best Actor
Martti Suosalo (Laugh or Die)

Best Supporting Actor
Jon Voight (Roe v. Wade)

Best Cinematography
Grand Cancan — Cinematography by Dmitriy Ulyukaev

2019 
Grand Prix
Doing Money — Directed by Lynsey Miller

Best Feature Film
M — Directed by Anna Eriksson

Best Director
Doing Money (Lynsey Miller)

Best Original Screenplay
Murder on the Road to Kathmandu — Original Screenplay by Rupalee Verma

Best Short Film
Dark like the Night. Karenina-2019 — Directed by Radda Novikova

Best Documentary Film
Three Scenes of a Wedding — Directed by Jason Tovey

Best Experimental Film
Fragmented Dreams — Directed by Tonatiuh Garcia

Best Music Video
Theresa's Groove — Directed by Aleksey Igudesman

Best Actor
Atul Kulkarni (Murder on the Road to Kathmandu)

Best Supporting Actor
Konstantin Khabensky (Dark like the Night. Karenina-2019)

Best Art Direction
The Lossen — Directed Colin Skevington

Best Cinematography
M — Cinematography by Matti Pyykkö

Best Film Score
Hinge — Film score by Diana Ringo

2018 
Grand Prix
I May Regret — Directed by Graham Streeter

Best Feature Film
NO-ONE — Directed by Lev Prudkin, Vladimir Prudkin

Best Director
I May Regret (Graham Streeter)

Best Original Screenplay
Rosemarie — Original Screenplay by Adonis Floridis

Best Short Film
Father of the Man — Directed by Tommy Creagh

Best Documentary Film
Ballad of a Righteous Merchant — Directed by Herbert Golder

Best Experimental Film
Ghosts on the Road to Camalt — Directed by Jason Tovey

Best Music Video
The Sea — Directed by Hisanori Tsukuda

Best Actor
Danny Glover (Buckout Road)

Best Cinematography
NO-ONE — Cinematography by Ziv Berkovich, David Stragmeister

Special Jury Prize
Krieg — Directed by Jeff Fry

2017 
Grand Prix (The Golden Sphinx)
Million Loves In Me — Directed by Sampson Yuen

Best Feature Film
Platonov — Directed by Andreas Morell

Best Director
Ebrahim Hatamikia (Bodyguard)

Best Original Screenplay
Million Loves in Me — Original Screenplay by John Yiu, Tiong Wooi LIM, Jeremy Tan

Best Short Film
Forgiveness — Directed by Rima Irani

Best Documentary Film
Chasing Stars — Directed by Markus Eichenberger
The Writer with No Hands — Directed by William Westaway

Best Experimental Film
Je Suis Le Ténébreux — Directed by Rank Amateur, Christopher Chaplin

Best Music Video
Nara - alt-J — Directed by Jasmin Selen Heinz

Best Actor
John Yiu (Million Loves in Me)

Best Supporting Actor
Babak Hamidian (Bodyguard)

Best Art Direction
Bodyguard — Directed by Ebrahim Hatamikia

Best Cinematography
Platonov — Cinematography by Felix Cramer

2016 
Grand Prix (The Golden Sphinx)
 Let's dance to the rhythm

Best Feature Film
 Imperfect Sky — Directed by Graham Streeter
Best Director
 Dito Tsintsadze (God of Happiness)
Best Original Screenplay
 The Closer — Original Screenplay by Eli Hershko & Isaac Broyn
Best Short Film
 After Truth — Directed by Nicolas Ehret
Best Animated Film
 “Parade” de Satie — Directed by Kōji Yamamura
Best Documentary Film
 Violins of Hope: Strings of the Holocaust — Directed by Lance Shultz
Best Experimental Film
 The Calling — Directed by Chris Boyd
Best Music Film
 Let's dance to the rhythm — Directed by Bardroy Barretto
Best Music Video
 Tiësto / The Chainsmokers - Split — Directed by Joe Zohar
Best Actor
 Blake Lewis (Imperfect Sky)
Best Supporting Actor
 Robert Berlin (The Closer)
Best Art Direction
 After Truth — Directed by Nicolas Ehret
 Let's Dance to the Rhythm — Directed by Bardroy Barretto
Best Cinematography
 God of Happiness — Cinematography by Ralf M. Mendle

See also 

 List of film festivals in Europe

References

External links 

 Official website of VIFF Vienna Independent Film Festival
 VIFF 2016 Festival Trailer
 Konkani film 'Nachom-ia-Kumpasar' to be screened at VIFF
 Article about VIFF 2016
 wien.at (German)
 meinbezirk.at God of Happiness (German)

Film festivals in Austria
Festivals in Vienna
Summer events in Austria